Randy Lynn Graff (born May 23, 1955) is an American actress and singer.

Career
Graff was born in Brooklyn, New York City and is a graduate of Wagner College. She is a cousin of actors Todd Graff and Ilene Graff.

Graff has been in feature films such as Keys to Tulsa and Rent as well as being in television shows such as NBC's Law & Order a number of times. In addition to film and television, Graff has been in several Broadway shows.

She originated the role of Fantine in the musical Les Misérables when the production opened on Broadway in 1987, which included "I Dreamed a Dream", also on the soundtrack released in 1990.

According to Graff, she was the first person to sing "I Dreamed a Dream" in the United States of America. She has also appeared in Broadway revivals of the musicals Damn Yankees and Fiddler on the Roof.

Graff teaches at the Manhattan School of Music.

Filmography
 Working It Out: "Pilot" (1990) TV Episode – Andy #1
 Law & Order
 "Sonata for Solo Organ" (1991) TV Episode – Dr. Martha Kershan
 "Attorney Client" (2002) TV Episode – Hillary Morton
 "Publish and Perish" (2005) TV Episode – Helen DeVries
 Drexell's Class (1991) TV Series – Principal Francine E. Itkin
 Mad About You: "Bedfellows" (1993) TV Episode – Sharon, Paul's older sister
 Bless This House: "Pilot" (1995) TV Episode – Marion
 Keys to Tulsa (1997) – Louise Brinkman
 Ed: "The Stars Align" (2001) TV Episode – Attorney
 Rent (2005) - Mrs. Cohen
 Learning to Drive (2014) – Attorney

Theatre
Broadway
Grease (1972)
Saravá (1979)
Les Misérables (1987) – Original Broadway cast
City of Angels (1989) – Original Broadway cast, Tony Award winner for Best Featured Actress in a Musical
Falsettos (1992)
Laughter on the 23rd Floor (1993)
Moon Over Buffalo (1995)       
High Society (1998)     
A Class Act (2001) – Original Broadway cast, Tony Awards nominee for Best Actress in a Musical  
Fiddler on the Roof (2004) – Revival  
Mr. Saturday Night (2022)  

Off-Broadway
 A... My Name Is Alice (1983 and 1984)
Do Re Mi (1999) Encores!, New York City – Kay Cram
Hotel Suite (2000) – Millie
A Class Act (2000) – Sophie
Damn Yankees (2008) – Revival
The Babylon Line (2016–2017) Lincoln Center Newhouse Theater – Frieda Cohen; Lucille Lortel Award for Featured Actress

Regional
 A Little Night Music (2002) – "Charlotte",  Kennedy Center for the Performing Arts, Washington, DC
Elegies: A Song Cycle (2006) – "Reprise! Broadway's Best "Marvelous Musical Mondays", Los Angeles, California
Hello, Dolly! (2007) – "Dolly", The Muny, St. Louis, Missouri
Broadway: Three Generations (2008) – Kennedy Center for the Performing Arts, Washington, DC
Damn Yankees (2008) – The New York City Center
Motherhood Out Loud (2009) – Bay Street Theatre, Sag Harbor, New York

References

External links

The Official Website for Randy Graff
 

TonyAwards.com Interview with Randy Graff

1955 births
American television actresses
Drama Desk Award winners
Living people
Tony Award winners
Wagner College alumni
American stage actresses
American film actresses
American musical theatre actresses
Actresses from New York City
Musicians from Brooklyn
21st-century American women